Styrene oxide is an epoxide derived from styrene.  It can be prepared by epoxidation of styrene with peroxybenzoic acid, in the Prilezhaev reaction:

Styrene oxide is slightly soluble in water. A trace amount of acid in water causes hydrolysis to racemic phenylethyleneglycol via a benzylic cation. If the amount of water is not sufficient, acid-catalyzed isomerization for phenylacetaldehyde will occur.

Styrene oxide in the body is metabolized to mandelic acid, phenylglyoxylic acid, benzoic acid and hippuric acid.

Hydrogenation of styrene oxide affords phenethyl alcohol.

Stereospecific reactions 
Since styrene oxide has a chiral center at the benzylic carbon atom, there are (R)-styrene oxide and (S)-styrene oxide. If optically pure reagent is used, only one optically pure compound will be obtained.

Toxicology 
Styrene oxide is a main metabolite of styrene in humans or animals, resulting from oxidation by cytochrome P450.  It is considered possibly carcinogenic from gavaging significant amounts into mice and rats. Styrene oxide is subsequently hydrolyzed in vivo to styrene glycol by epoxide hydrolase.

Styrene oxide has a chiral center and thus two enantiomers. It has been reported that the two enantiomers had different toxicokinetics and toxicity. It was reported that the (R)-styrene oxide was preferentially formed in mice, especially in the lung, whereas the (S)-styrene oxide was preferentially generated in rats. In human volunteers, the cumulative excretion of the (S)-enantiomer of styrene glycol and mandelic acid were higher than the R form after exposure to styrene. In human liver microsomes, cytochrome P450-mediated styrene oxidation showed the production of more S enantiomer relative to the R enantiomer. It was also found that (S)-styrene oxide was preferentially hydrolyzed than the R enantiomer in human liver microsomes.  Animal studies have shown that the (R)-enantiomer of styrene oxide was more toxic than the (S)-enantiomer in mice.

References

Epoxides
Phenyl compounds
IARC Group 2A carcinogens